Count Nikita Moiseevich Zotov (1644 – December 1717) was a childhood tutor and lifelong friend of Russian Tsar Peter the Great. Historians disagree on the quality of Zotov's tutoring. Robert K. Massie, for example, praises his efforts, but Lindsey Hughes criticizes the education that he gave to the future tsar.

Not much is known about Zotov's life aside from his connection to Peter. Zotov left Moscow for a diplomatic mission to Crimea in 1680 and returned to Moscow before 1683. He became part of the "Jolly Company", a group of several dozen of Peter's friends that eventually became The All-Joking, All-Drunken Synod of Fools and Jesters. Zotov was mockingly appointed "Prince-Pope" of the Synod, and regularly led them in games and celebrations. He accompanied Peter on many important occasions, such as the Azov campaigns and the torture of the Streltsy after their uprising. Zotov held a number of state posts, including from 1701 a leading position in the Tsar's personal secretariat. Three years before his death, Zotov married a woman 50 years his junior. He died in December 1717 of unknown causes.

Tutelage of Peter I

Background

Alexis I, Tsar of Russia, married twice in his lifetime, first to Maria Miloslavskaya and then to Natalia Naryshkina after Maria's death. Peter I was born to Natalia Naryshkina on 30 May 1672. After the death of Tsar Alexis on 8 February 1676, Peter's half-brother and godfather Feodor, the "semi-invalid eldest surviving son of Maria Miloslavskaya", became the Tsar of Russia. Ivan Miloslavsky, Feodor's uncle, returned to Moscow from virtual exile as Governor of Astrakhan to become Chief Minister. His family had not been in power for some time as a result of Tsar Alexis' remarriage. As a result, Ivan Miloslavsky hated the Naryshkin family, which included Peter, Natalia Naryshkina, and Natalia's foster father, Artamon Matveyev. When a new ruling family took over, the previous ruling family was usually banished to a ceremonial position somewhere far from Moscow. Instead, Ivan Miloslavsky tried to arrest the Naryshkins, but Feodor would only permit him to exile Artamon Matveyev. Feodor was fond of his half-brother Peter and Peter's mother, and both were allowed to remain in the Kremlin in private apartments.

Most 17th-century Muscovites received little education, and there were low levels of literacy even among the nobility, education for whom typically consisted of a little reading, writing, and a small amount of history and geography. Religious scholars were usually the exception to this rule and were often also taught grammar, mathematics, and foreign languages. Two of Tsar Alexis' children—Feodor, and his sister Tsarevna Sophia—received a thorough education from the religious scholars of Kiev, and could speak Latin and Polish.

At the age of three, in 1674 or 1675, Peter received a primer from Tsar Alexis to help him learn the alphabet; two years later, Tsar Feodor suggested to Peter's mother that he begin his studies. Estimates of the exact year when Peter's tutoring began range widely; numerous authors refer to a starting date as early as 1677, and as late as 1683, though multiple references specifically identify 12 March 1677 as the beginning of Peter's tutoring. Nikita Zotov, a former church clerk, or "Duma secretary" from the tax-collection department of the governmental bureaucracy, was chosen to teach Peter to read and write.

Appointment and instruction

Zotov was not a religious scholar, but he knew the Bible well—an important qualification for Tsaritsa Natalia. Although he did not expect it, he was well rewarded before he had even started his work, receiving from Feodor and the Tsaritsa, as well as Patriarch Joachim, gifts including a set of apartments, two new sets of clothing, and 100 rubles. He was also raised to the rank of a minor nobleman. Zotov was deeply humbled and overwhelmed by the Tsaritsa's request, and was enthralled at the prospect of teaching Peter. Zotov and Peter quickly became good friends, and Zotov remained close to Peter until the former's death.

Peter's first lesson began the morning after Zotov was appointed. After the books were sprinkled with holy water, Zotov began his instruction; first in the alphabet, and then the Prayer Book. He taught the Bible, from which Peter learned long passages that he could still recite from memory forty years later. Zotov also taught his student to sing, and in his later years Peter often spontaneously accompanied choirs at church services. Although initially tasked only to teach reading and writing, Zotov found Peter to be intellectually curious, and interested in all that he could impart. Peter asked for lessons on Russian history, battles, and heroes. At Zotov's request, the Tsaritsa ordered engravings of "foreign cities and palaces, sailing ships, weapons and historical events" to be brought from the Ordnance Office. Zotov placed them in the study room, along with a somewhat accurate globe for the time, to divert Peter when he became bored with his studies. Other informal "makeshift" tutors (foreign and domestic) and servants, were brought in for rowdy outdoor games with live ammunition. They were also to instruct Peter in other subjects such as royal and military history, blacksmithing, carpentry, joinery, printing, and, unusually for Russian nobility at the time, sailing and shipbuilding.

Impact

Zotov became one of Peter's first friends, and the two remained close throughout Zotov's life. Lindsey Hughes, a 20th-century historian, has criticized Zotov for giving Peter an education that did not teach what a future tsar ought to know. Her contemporary, Robert K. Massie, has argued that the education was the best possible one for a curious boy like Peter, because it was unlikely that he would ever become tsar, as his half-brother, Ivan V, was before him in the line of succession. According to Massie, although Zotov may have not taught Peter at the highest possible level, he delivered "the best education for a mind like Peter's", as it "stimulated [Peter's] curiosity" and allowed him to become "in large part, a self-taught man". Zotov's closeness to the Tsar later became a source of worry to others in government, many of whom—including even the powerful Menshikov—feared his influence.

In 1680, Zotov embarked on a three-year diplomatic mission to the Crimea; sources disagree on whether this was before or after he tutored Peter. When Peter left the Kremlin to spend his childhood at Preobrazhenskoye, two years after Zotov's departure, his memories of the tutors who had taught his siblings, Feodor and Sophia, were so negative that he cut himself off from traditional academic subjects for a time. He later resumed his studies under Afanassyi Nesterov and Zotov after the latter's return from the Crimea. Although Peter sought to learn of nature and military matters rather than literature or theology, he nevertheless learned a great deal of the latter from his tutors. Zotov (and later his sons) later worked with Peter to translate books about fortification from a Western European language into Russian. Peter did not learn, or forgot, a great deal about mathematics, a subject that he had to learn properly in his late teens for use in siege warfare and fortification. In later years, Peter regretted his lack of a fuller education, and sought to give his daughters Anne and Elizabeth educations equivalent of any European princess.

Prince-Pope of Drunken Synod
In 1692, Peter, who by then was Tsar of Russia, organized himself and several dozen of his friends into The All-Joking, All-Drunken Synod of Fools and Jesters, a "synod" that parodied religion. Although he had a reputation for sobriety and fasting, Zotov was appointed the "Prince-Pope" of the Synod because of that very fact. He was sometimes even referred to as Patriarch Bacchus. Peter forced him to participate in the parties even when Zotov claimed sickness and exhaustion.

However, Zotov soon grew to be a key participant in the mocking celebrations. After first drinking to everyone's health, he "blessed" the group with the Sign of the Cross, using two long Dutch pipes. On holidays, the games were played on the streets of Moscow, and at Christmas, the Jolly Company rode around the city singing on sleighs, with Zotov at their head, on a sleigh pulled by twelve bald men. Zotov wore a highly unusual costume—his outfit was adorned with playing cards; he wore a tin hat; and he sat upon a barrel. During the first week of Lent, a procession of "penitents" followed Zotov through the city on donkeys, oxen, and sleighs pulled by goats, pigs, and bears.

High office

In 1695 and 1696, Peter the Great mounted two campaigns against the Turkish garrison of Azov. Though the campaign in 1695 was ultimately unsuccessful, the 1696 one succeeded. The Russians surrounded the city with both men and ships and breached the wall, causing the Pasha of Azov to "surrender under honorable conditions". The people of Moscow were amazed by the news of the surrender; not since the reign of Peter's father Alexis had a Russian army been victorious. Peter delayed his return home to allow Andrew Vinius, another member of the All-Joking Company, time to set up a victory parade through the capital. The army returned home on 10 October, but instead of a traditional Orthodox reception, the army marched through an arch seemingly supported by Hercules and Mars. Contrary to the custom for a tsar, Peter did not ride at the head of the procession, but instead allowed it to be led by 18 horsemen leading carriages carrying Zotov and the war hero Fedor Golovin.

While on a tour of Europe in 1698, Peter learned that the Streltsy had rebelled, and immediately rushed home from Vienna. After defeating the rebellious regiments, Peter angrily ordered the torture of those who had incited the Streltsy to rebel. For almost a month and a half, men from Peter's Jolly Company, including Fyodor Romodanovsky, Boris Golitsyn, and Zotov, led the torture in secret.

In 1701, Zotov was made the head of the Tsar's newly created Privy Council, a committee akin to the defunct Duma. In 1710, Peter made Zotov a count, and a year later  when Peter set up the Governing Senate, he appointed Zotov to oversee the Senate.

Personal life

Nikita Zotov was twice married, and had three sons from his first marriage. One was Vasily Zotov (d. 1729), who was educated outside of Russia and became the Revisor-General of Ukazes (Inspector General of Decrees) in November 1715. As Inspector General, it was Vasily's job to preside over the Senate, enforce its decrees, and report absent senators to Peter. Vasily had little political power however, and so was unable to fulfill his role in opposition to the wishes of some of the most powerful men in the Russian empire. The second son was Ivan Zotov (1687–1723), who lived and studied in France, where he worked as a translator. The third son, Konon Zotov (1690–30 December 1742), studied in England, and served in various positions in the Russian Navy and in the Russian judicial system.

According to Robert K. Massie and Lindsey Hughes, Peter told Zotov in October 1713 that he intended to have him marry a second time, to Anna Pashkova, a widow 50 years Zotov's junior, despite Zotov's wish to spend his final years in a monastery. However, the Brockhaus and Efron Encyclopedic Dictionary and Sergey Solovyov say that Zotov came up with the idea to marry Pashkova in 1714, and that his plan to become a monk was merely a joke.

The wedding was described by Friedrich Christian Weber, the ambassador of Hanover, as "solemnized by the court in masks". Guests were instructed to pre-register in groups of three with their costumes so as not to look too similar to other guests. Witnesses described the event, which took place on 27 and 28 January 1715, and which had been prepared for three months, as a "world turned upside-down". The Jolly Company dressed in ridiculous regalia, and many people behaved exactly opposite to the norm; "invitations to the guests were delivered by stammerers, the bridesmen were cripples, the runners were fat men with gout, the priest was allegedly one hundred years old" (and blind). Hughes notes that the event may have been a "variation on the Western charivari or shaming ceremonies", through which the Tsar could demonstrate how much power he had over his subjects' lives. During the wedding, the Drunken Synod routinely sang carols in the streets of Moscow and demanded money, which became a New Year tax for the wealthy.

Death
Nikita Zotov died in December 1717 of unknown causes. Peter wasted no time in moving on, at least publicly; he replaced Zotov as "Prince-Pope" with Peter Buturlin by "electing" him on 28 December 1717, and appointing him on 10 January 1718. Peter even ordered that Zotov's widow be married to Buturlin in the fall of 1721. There was a disagreement between Konon Zotov and his stepmother over the division of Nikita Zotov's estate; Konon tried to declare Nikita's second marriage illegitimate, to avoid having to give any money to his stepmother's family.

References

Bibliography

1644 births
1717 deaths
People from Moscow
Peter the Great
17th-century Russian people
18th-century people from the Russian Empire
Counts of the Russian Empire